Marble Cave can refer to:

 Marble Cave, Kosovo
 Marble Cave (Crimea)